Wasimul Bari Rajib (known as Rajib; 1 January 1952 – 14 November 2004) was a Bangladeshi actor. He served as the managing director of the Bangladesh Film Development Corporation (FDC). He acted in more than 400 films. He won Bangladesh National Film Award for Best Supporting Actor four times for his roles in Heeramati (1988), Danga (1991), Bidroho Charidike (2000) and Sahoshi Manush Chai (2003).

As a politician, Rajib served as the president of JASAS, the cultural wing of Bangladesh Nationalist Party.

Career
In 1979, Rajib debuted acting in the film Rakhe Allah Mare Ke.

Rajib was married to Ismat Ara Debi. Together they had a son Deep.

Filmography

References

External links
 

1952 births
2004 deaths
Bangladeshi male film actors
Best Supporting Actor National Film Award (Bangladesh) winners
Deaths from colorectal cancer
Place of birth missing